This article lists the diplomatic missions in South Ossetia. South Ossetia is a region that broke away from Georgia in 1991 and got its first international recognition after the 2008 South Ossetia war. The country has been recognized by Abkhazia, Donetsk People's Republic, Luhansk People's Republic, Nauru, Nagorno-Karabakh, Nicaragua, Russia, Transnistria, and Venezuela. At present, the capital Tskhinvali hosts two embassies and three representative office. Venezuelan and Nicaraguan ambassadors reside in Moscow.

Embassies 
Tskhinvali

Representative offices

Subnational 
 (annexed by Russia in 2022, internationally unrecognized)
 (annexed by Russia in 2022, internationally unrecognized)

Non-resident embassies

 (Moscow)
 (Moscow)

See also 
Foreign relations of South Ossetia
List of diplomatic missions of South Ossetia

Notes

References

External links
Ministry of Foreign Affairs of the Republic of South Ossetia

Foreign relations of South Ossetia
South Ossetia
Diplomatic missions

Diplomatic missions